Tillandsia intermedia is a species of flowering plant in the genus Tillandsia. The species is endemic to western Mexico, reported from Guerrero, Sinaloa, and Jalisco.

Cultivars 
 Tillandsia 'Curly Slim' (T. intermedia × T. streptophylla)
 Tillandsia 'Dimmitt's Delight'
 Tillandsia 'Kanyan' (T. intermedia × T. baileyi)
 Tillandsia 'KimThoa Aldridge' (T. intermedia × T. concolor)
 Tillandsia 'Long John' (T. pseudobaileyi × T. intermedia)
 Tillandsia 'Mudlo' (T. intermedia × T. ionantha)
 Tillandsia 'Victory' (T. intermedia × T. capitata)

References

External links

intermedia
Endemic flora of Mexico
Plants described in 1903